Events from the year 1978 in Ireland.

Incumbents
 President: Patrick Hillery
 Taoiseach: Jack Lynch (FF)
 Tánaiste: George Colley (FF)
 Minister for Finance: George Colley (FF)
 Chief Justice: Tom O'Higgins
 Dáil: 21st
 Seanad: 14th

Events
 18 January – The European Court of Human Rights found Britain guilty of inhuman and degrading treatment of republican internees in Northern Ireland.
 19 January – The Fianna Fáil government dismissed the Garda Commissioner Edmund Garvey. No explanation was given.
 21 January – Johnny Giles resigned as manager of the Republic of Ireland national football team.
 23 March – The state funeral of former President Cearbhall Ó Dálaigh took place in Sneem, County Kerry.
 31 March – Six thousand people marched through Dublin to Wood Quay to protest against the building of civic offices above an ancient Viking settlement.
 27 May – Brittany Ferries inaugurated a regular Cork–Roscoff service.
 1 June – David Cook of the Alliance Party became the first non-Unionist Lord Mayor of Belfast.
 10 August – A new £10 note bearing an image of the writer Jonathan Swift was introduced.
 19 August – Over 5,000 people took part in a rally against a proposed nuclear power station in Carnsore Point, County Wexford.
 1 September – Dublin Institute of Technology was created on an ad hoc basis by the City of Dublin Vocational Education Committee.
 2 November – Ireland's second national television channel, RTÉ 2, opened with a live broadcast from the Cork Opera House.
 November – Cork Regional Hospital officially opened in Cork.
 Undated – The first Supermac's fast food restaurant opened.

Arts and literature
 Iris Murdoch is awarded the Booker Prize for her novel The Sea, The Sea.
 Peter Sheridan is awarded the Rooney Prize for Irish Literature.
 Seán Ó Ríordáin's posthumous poetry collection Tar éis mo Bháis is published.
First broadcast of craft TV series Hands.

Sport

Athletics
25 March – John Treacy wins the world cross-country championship in Glasgow.

Golf
Carroll's Irish Open is won by Ken Brown (Scotland).

Horse racing
Shergar wins The Derby (by a record ten lengths) and Irish Derby.

Births
11 January – Adrian O'Connor, backstroke swimmer.
12 January – David Worrell, soccer player.
19 January – Simon Webb, soccer player.
30 January – John Doyle, Kildare Gaelic footballer.
21 February – Damien English, Fine Gael TD for Meath West.
23 February – Jason Byrne, soccer player.
7 March – John Miskella, Cork Gaelic footballer.
9 March – Derek O'Connor, soccer player.
16 March – Jemma Redmond, biochemist, pioneer of 3D bioprinting (died 2016).
2 April – John Hoyne, Kilkenny hurler.
4 April – Alan Mahon, soccer player.
5 April – Stephen Murphy, soccer player.
19 April – Geordan Murphy, International rugby player.
23 April – Nicholas Murphy, Cork Gaelic footballer.
24 April – Jimmy Coogan, Kilkenny hurler.
29 April – David O'Loughlin, cyclist.
4 May – Stanerra, racehorse.
5 May – Paul Byrne, broadcast journalist.
10 June – Karl Scully, tenor.
21 June – Wayne Sherlock, Cork hurler.
25 June – Kieran Kelly, jump jockey (killed in racing accident 2003).
4 July – Derek Lyng, Kilkenny hurler.
18 July
Shane Horgan, International rugby player.
Annie Mac(Manus), DJ and broadcast presenter.
27 July – Brian Barry-Murphy, soccer player.
July – Diarmuid O'Sullivan, Cork hurler.
8 August – Alan Maybury, soccer player.
21 August – Alan Lee, soccer player.
28 August – Barry Ryan, soccer player.
27 September – John Paul Phelan, Fine Gael Senator.
1 October – Barry Conlon, soccer player.
2 October – Eddie Brennan, Kilkenny hurler.
5 October – Shane Ryan, Gaelic footballer.
9 October – Nicky Byrne, entertainer, singer with Westlife & TV host.
17 October – Jerry Flannery, international rugby player.
25 October – Chris Keane, rugby player.
31 October – Ella McSweeney, radio and television producer
9 November – Martin Comerford, Kilkenny hurler.
15 December – Edele and Keavy Lynch, members of B*Witched.
22 December – Eugene Cloonan, Galway hurler.

Full date unknown
Caoimhe Butterly, human rights activist.
Julie Feeney, singer songwriter.
Mike FitzGerald, Limerick hurler.
Richie Mullally, Kilkenny hurler.
Mike O'Brien, Limerick hurler.

Deaths
23 January – Cormac Breslin, Fianna Fáil TD and Ceann Comhairle of Dáil Éireann (born 1902).
4 March – Emmet Dalton, Republican activist, soldier and film producer (born 1898 in the United States).
6 March – Micheál MacLiammóir, actor and dramatist (born 1899 in London).
21 March – Cearbhall Ó Dálaigh, Attorney-general, Chief Justice of Ireland and fifth President of Ireland (born 1911).
7 July – Mary Swanzy, painter (born 1882; died in London).
28 August – Robert Shaw, actor and novelist (born 1927 in England).
12 September – Wilfred Hutton, cricketer (born 1901).
October – Moss (Maurice) Twomey, chief of staff of the Irish Republican Army (born 1897).
5 November – Denis O'Dea, actor (born 1905).
13 December – Jack Doyle, boxer, actor and singer (born 1913; died in London).
Full date unknown – Gabriel Hayes, sculptor, designer of Irish coins (born 1909).

See also
1978 in Irish television

References

 
1970s in Ireland
Ireland
Years of the 20th century in Ireland